The 1948 BYU Cougars football team was an American football team that represented Brigham Young University (BYU) as a member of the Skyline Six Conference during the 1948 college football season. In their eighth and final season under head coach Eddie Kimball, the Cougars compiled an overall record of 5–6 with a mark of 1–3 against conference opponents, finished fifth in the Skyline Six, and were outscored by a total of 199 to 135.

Schedule

References

BYU
BYU Cougars football seasons
BYU Cougars football